Come My Way is the second studio album by Australian singer Christine Anu. It was her first studio album in five years, after releasing her debut album Stylin' Up in 1995.
The album peaked at number 18 in October 2000, becoming Anu's highest charting album.

At the ARIA Music Awards of 2001, the album was nominated for two awards; Best Pop Release and Best Female Artist but lost out on both to Light Years by Kylie Minogue.

Come My Way received warm reviews with Steve Rendle of the Evening Post saying it's “a great pop record” and “magic.” He also noted that “Anu’s voice is a sparkling joy.”

Track listing

Charts

Certifications

References

External links 

2000 albums
Mushroom Records albums
Christine Anu albums